Virginia Lakes is an unincorporated community and census-designated place (CDP) in Mono  County, California, United States. It is located on the eastern side of the Sierra Nevada in the area of the Virginia Lakes basin, at the southwest end of Virginia Lakes Road, which leads northeast  to U.S. Route 395 at Conway Summit. The community was first listed as a CDP for the 2020 census, when it had a population of 7.

References 

Census-designated places in Mono County, California
Census-designated places in California